The Bay Class Lifeboat is a Robert Allan Ltd. modification of the shorter Royal National Lifeboat Institution's Severn-class lifeboat to meet the needs of the Canadian Coast Guard for off-shore search and rescue operations in severe conditions.  They are referred to as the Bay class as each one is named after a Canadian bay.

Programme
In 2015, the Canadian Coast Guard announced a request for proposals (RFP) to build up to ten new search and rescue lifeboats as part of Canada's National Shipbuilding Procurement Strategy.  The total has now been increased to 20, with Hike Metal Products of Wheatley, Ontario and Chantier Naval Forillon of Gaspé, Quebec equally building 10 each.

The vessels are intended to replace the Coast Guard's ten Arun-class lifeboats, which averaged 18 years of service at the time of the RFP.

The new design is the work of Canadian nautical architectural firm Robert Allan Ltd. and is a modification of the Severn-class lifeboat, making the vessels more suited to the extreme weather conditions that can be found off Newfoundland and Nova Scotia. They are capable of operating in  waves, and in wind conditions at 12 on the Beaufort scale. The vessels' hulls will be aluminum, not FRC (fibre reinforced composite), as with the original Severn design.

References

Motor lifeboats of the Canadian Coast Guard